Irvin "Marky" Markowitz (aka Irwin Markowitz, Irving Markowitz; December 11, 1923 - November 18, 1986) was an American jazz trumpeter.

Born the youngest of seven children of Russian-Jewish immigrants who disembarked in Baltimore, and settled on 4 1/2 Street, Southwest, in Washington, D.C., Markowitz learned the trumpet at the local Police Boys' Club. He played early in his career in a number of big bands, including those of Charlie Spivak (1941–42), Jimmy Dorsey, Boyd Raeburn, and Woody Herman (1946). He played in Buddy Rich's orchestra in 1946–47, then returned to service under Herman in 1947–48. Moving his family from Washington, D.C. to New York in 1958, and eventually settling in Nyack, he worked primarily as a studio musician in the 1960s, 1970s, and 1980s. Some live appearances included work with Herman, Gene Krupa (1958), Lee Konitz (1959), Ralph Burns, George Russell, Al Cohn (1962), Paul Desmond (1969), and Bill Evans (1974). Marky was a "first call" trumpeter for many top artists of the 1960s, 1970s, and 1980s, including Paul Simon, Aretha Franklin, Stevie Wonder, the Young Rascals, Frank Sinatra, Tony Bennett, Dionne Warwick, Maynard Ferguson, George Segal, and many others, as well as hundreds of advertising "jingles", TV ads and movie scores. He was a perennial on the Jerry Lewis Labor Day Telethon for Muscular Dystrophy, and known for a "sweet" tone on the trumpet and flugelhorn, as well as a better-than-average vocal impression of Louis "Satchmo" Armstrong, which was featured on a 1970s TV commercial for Hecker's Flour. In January 1985, just the year before his death at age 62, Marky returned to his hometown of Washington, D.C. to perform with an All-Star band, led by famed composer/arranger Nelson Riddle, at the Inaugural Ball for President Ronald Reagan's 2nd term. He led only one recording session, for Harry Lim's Famous Door label in 1976.

Discography
With David Amram
Subway Night   (RCA, 1973)
With Burt Bacharach/Dionne Warwick
Walk On By (1964)
With Richard Barbary
Soul Machine (A&M, 1968)
With Gato Barbieri
Caliente   (A&M, 1976)
With Louie Bellson
Breakthrough!   (Project 3, 1968)
With Tony Bennett
Fool of Fools (45rpm, CBS, 1968)
Play it Again, Sam (45rpm, CBS, 1969)
What The World Needs Now Is Love   (45rpm, CBS, 1969)
You Can't Love 'Em All   (Columbia, 1959)
Ask Anyone In Love   (Columbia, 1959)
Yesterday I Heard the Rain   (Columbia, 1968)
I've Gotta Be Me   (Columbia, 1969)
Summer of '42   (Columbia, 1972)
With Sonny Berman
Early Bebop Pioneer   (Gramercy, 1948)
With Brasilia Nueva
How Insensitive   (Decca, 1967)
With Bob Brookmeyer
Portrait of the Artist (Atlantic, 1960)
With Solomon Burke
The Best of Solomon Burke   (Atlantic, 1964)
With Ralph Burns
Where There's Burns, There's Fire   (Warwick, 1961)
With Paul Butterfield
Put It In Your Ear   (Bearsville, 1976)
With Emmett Carls / Lennie Tristano
The Lost Session   (Jazz Guild, rec. 1945, rel. 1976)
With Barbara Carroll
From The Beginning   (United Artists, 1977)
With Chris Connor
Free Spirits   (Atlantic, 1962)
With King Curtis
Jazz Super Hits, Vol. 2 "Philly Dog"   (Atlantic, 1966)
With Paul Desmond
From the Hot Afternoon (A&M/CTI, 1969)
With Neil Diamond
In My Lifetime   (Rel. 1996, Columbia)
With Bo Diddley
Big Bad Bo  (Chess, 1974)
With Duke Ellington
Best Of the War Years   (Rel. 1993)
With Bill Evans
Symbiosis   (MPS, 1974)
The Ivory Hunters   (United Artists, 1959)
With Maynard Ferguson
Conquistador   (Columbia, 1977)
With Astrud Gilberto
That Girl From Ipanema   (Image, 1977)
With Dizzy Gillespie
One Night in Washington (Elektra/Musician, 1955 [1983])
With Grant Green
Afro Party   (Blue Note, 1971)
With Bobby Hebb
Sunny   (Philips, 1966)
With Woody Herman
Twelve Shades of Blue   (Columbia, 1947)
"Woodchoppers"   (Mosaic, 1947)
The Thundering Herds   (Columbia, 1947)
Blowin' Up a Storm   (Columbia, 1947)
The Fourth Herd   (Riverside/Jazzland, 1959)
First Herd at Carnegie Hall   (Verve, 1946)
With Tommy James and the Shondells
I Think We're Alone Now   (1967)
With Tamiko Jones
I'll Be Anything for You  (A&M, 1968)
With Ben E. King
Seven Letters   (Atco, 1964)
With Lee Konitz
You and Lee (Verve, 1959)
With Gene Krupa
Gerry Mulligan Arrangements   (Verve, 1958)
With The Manhattan Transfer
The Best of the Manhattan Transfer  (1981)
Pastiche   (Atlantic, 1978)
With Herbie Mann
My Kinda Groove (Atlantic, 1964)
Our Mann Flute   (Columbia, 1964)
The Best of Herbie Mann   (Atlantic, 1966)
With Jackie McLean
Monuments   (RCA, 1979)
With Carmen McRae
Birds of a Feather (Decca, 1958)
With Butch Miles
Miles and Miles of Swing   (Famous Door, 1977)
With Blue Mitchell
Many Shades of Blue   (Mainstream, 1974)
With Hugo Montenegro
Cha Chas for Dancing   (1966)
With James Moody
Moody with Strings (Argo, 1961)
With Claus Ogerman Orchestra
Bill Evans Trio with Claus Ogerman Orchestra   (MPS, 1974)
With Felix Pappalardi
Don't Worry, Ma  (A&M, 1979)
With Bill Potts
Bye Bye Birdie   (Colpix, 1963)
The Jazz Soul of Porgy and Bess   (United Artists, 1959)
How Insensitive   (Decca, 1967)
With Tito Puente
Herman's Heat and Puente's Beat   (Palladium, 1958)
With Buddy Rich
Both Sides   (Mercury, 1976)
The Rich Rebellion   (Mercury, 1960)
The Driver   (EmArcy, 1960)
With Lalo Schifrin
New Fantasy (Verve, 1964)
With George Segal
The Yama Yama Man   (Philips, 1967)
With Bobby Short
No Strings   (Atlantic, 1962)
With Paul Simon
One Trick Pony   (Warner Bros, 1980)
The Essential Paul Simon   (Sony, Rel. 2010)
With Zoot Sims
The Aztec Suite   (United Artists, 1959)
With Jimmy Smith
The Cat   (Verve, 1964)
With Howard Tate
Howard Tate   (Atlantic, 1971)
With Joe Thomas
Masada   (Groove Merchant, 1975)
With Joe Timer and Charles Mingus
Tiny's Blues   (Mythic, 1953)
With Leslie Uggams
My Own Morning   (Atlantic, 1967)
With Frankie Valli
Can't Take My Eyes Off Of You    (1967)
With Loudon Wainwright III
T Shirt   (Arista, 1976)
With Grover Washington Jr.
All the King's Horses   (Kudu, 1972)
With Kai Winding
The In Instrumentals (Verve, 1965)

Film credits
 All That Jazz (1979)
 Badge 373 (1973)
 Bananas (1971)
 Being There   (1979)
 The Boys in the Band   (1970)
 The Cotton Club   (1984)
 The Fan   (1981)
 Foul Play   (1978)
 Four Jills in a Jeep   (1944)
 Frosty's Winter Wonderland   (1979)
 Good Morning, Vietnam   (1987)
 Hair   (1979)
 The Heartbreak Kid   (1972)
 Lenny   (1974)
 The Lords of Flatbush   (1974)
 Made for Each Other   (1971)
 National Lampoon's Movie Madness   (1983)
 Pennies From Heaven   (1981)
 Pin Up Girl   (1944)
 Prime Suspect /aka/ Cry of Innocence   (1982)
 Stagecoach   (1966)
 Take the Money and Run   (1969)

Television 
 ABC World News Tonight theme
 The Price Is Right theme (CBS)
 20/20 theme (ABC)

References 

 Feather, Leonard. The Biographical Encyclopedia of Jazz. 1960. pp 322.
 Yanow, Scott. Trumpet Kings. 2001. pp. 243.
 Yanow, Scott. [ Irwin "Marky" Markowitz] at Allmusic.

1923 births
1986 deaths
Musicians from Washington, D.C.
American jazz trumpeters
American male trumpeters
20th-century American musicians
20th-century trumpeters
20th-century American male musicians
American male jazz musicians